Mansour (Arabic: منصور) is an Emirati cartoon. It was created to engage young Arab audiences in their native customs, culture, and heritage.

Plot 
The show revolves around Mansour, an excitable, curious 12 year old who tends to live life to its fullest. Throughout the show, Mansour finds himself thrown into numerous escapades alongside his friends and family, teaching both Mansour and the audience important morals and lessons along the way.

Characters 
Mansour (منصور)
Voiced by: Marwa Rateb / Mashael Al Shehi
Mansour is the titular main character of the show. He is a young Emirati boy with a penchant for sports and science, although his natural inquisitiveness often lead him to various misadventures.

Khalid (خالد)
Voiced by: Saoud Karamastaji
Khalid is Mansour's father. As a pilot, Khalid frequently travels and witnesses all sorts of sights from all over the world, many of which he shares with his family through his countless stories.

Mariam (مريم)
Voiced by: Raja Al Noaman
Mariam is Mansour's mother who is shown to dote lovingly on her family. She is a creative, artistic person who firmly believes in the importance of women in today's world.

Sara (سارة)
Voiced by: Raja Al Noaman
Sara is Mansour's younger sister. She is talkative and terribly curious about the things Mansour and his friends do. Her pet parrot, Bibi, is equally as loud as her, if not more.

Saqer (صقر)
Voiced by: Mansoor Al Feeli
Saqer is Mansour's grandfather who often serves as a bridge between Mansour and his heritage. He used to be a pearl diver in the past, but now he regales those days by teaching his grandchildren about the traditions and life back then.

Naser (ناصر)
Voiced by: Omar Al Mulla
Naser is Mansour's older brother. He is a university student working towards his business degree. Naser and Mansour are prone to the occasional quarrel, but Naser is more than willing to give his little brother advice when he needs it.

Turki' (تركي) 
Turki is Salem's cousin, he is from Saudi Arabia, his first appearance was in the whirlpool of doom when he saves Mansour, Nasser, Salem, and Obaid in a heroic way during the sandstorm, he doesn't talk much as his peers, but behind his mind, a computer is there.

Production

Development

Mansour was created by Rashed Al Harmoodi and was initially produced by Fanar Productions during its first season. The concept for the show was pitched at the Abu Dhabi Festival and its positive reception led Al Harmoodi to continue with the project. Negotiations for its release soon followed throughout the latter half of 2012, eventually ending with its primary investor Mubadala Development Company signing agreements with Abu Dhabi Media and Dubai Media Incorporated in December.

Al Harmoodi developed Mansour as a way of "strengthening Emirati youths' bonds to their national identity and values" and "encouraging them to learn about all the modern developments taking place in [the UAE]". A few writers from Shaabiyat Al Cartoon (شعبية الكرتون), another home-grown production, have also joined the crew in an attempt to keep the humor "snappy and very local". Other than its stories and morals, its production team has also worked on making Mansour's animation as "first-class" as possible to stand out amongst international standards. The Co-Founder and General Manager of Fanar Productions, Haider Mohamed, boasted to use "cutting-edge technology with powerful storylines" in hopes of attracting young audiences to the show, making it another creative first for the UAE.

Broadcast

In January 2013, Mansour debuted its 13-episode run on some of the UAE's major channels, including the Abu Dhabi Emirates channel and Sama Dubai TV. Mansour was then extended for a second season, but it would no longer be produced by Fanar Productions. The second season was instead produced by Cartoon Network Arabic and Twofour54, with Mubadala keeping its stay on the project as its main source of funds.

On March 30, 2014, Mansour aired on Cartoon Network Arabic, introducing the show to a wider audience across the MENA region. A third season has been commissioned by Cartoon Network Arabic and is set to finish up by 2017.

Episodes

Revival
In October 2022, it was announced that the show is getting a revival with 52 episodes that is focusing on AI, space exploration and climate emergency. It is being animated in Adobe Flash instead of CGI.

In December 5, the series is set to release in Summer 2023, titled "The Adventures of Mansour: Age of A.I.".

Departments

Directors

Simon Ward-Horner
Stu Gamble

Script writers

Dan Balaam
Writer and Producer

Khulood Al Ali
Arabic dialogue writer 
(26 episodes, 2017)

Hamed Al Harthi
Arabic dialogue writer 
(26 episodes, 2015)

Saoud Karmastaji
Arabic dialogue writer 
(26 episodes, 2015)

Nassma Al Bahrani
Arabic dialogue writer 
(26 episodes, 2015)

Discussing the writing process, the creator, Al Harmoodi, said it was the hardest part, and that the script is first written in English and then Arabic, as the writer is an English-speaker.

Editorial department

Adam Khwaja
Script Editor

Rashed Al Harmoodi
Script editor 
(26 episodes, 2015)

Mouthanna Al-Sayegh
Online editor 
(52 episodes, 2015–2017)

Sound department

Tom Bailey
Mansour theme and original music composition / composer: theme music                
(52 episodes, 2015–2017)

Stefan Mcdad
Sound design and mixing (52 episodes, 2015–2017)

Musaed Al-Hendi
Sound editor 
(26 episodes, 2017)

Yousef Bu Khamas
Sound design and mixing 
(26 episodes, 2017)

Companies

Distribution

Mubadala (2013) (United Arab Emirates) (TV)

Other

ICE Animations (animation and effects)Yowza Digital (storyboards)

Trivia
Mansour's merchandising ranges from clothing to smartphone applications. Al Harmoodi has expressed joy at this, saying that "seeing Mansour side-by-side with other global characters on retailer shelves is a dream come true".

Awards 
Cartoon Network Studios Arabia won ‘Best Use of Animation’ Award for Mansour (Season 2) at the Digital Studios Awards Ceremony on Wednesday, March 9, 2016.

External links
http://www.imdb.com/title/tt5471188/fullcredits#writers - A list of all the cast and crew involved in its production
http://www.imdb.com/title/tt5471188/epcast?ref_=ttfc_ql_tv_2 - A list of all the episode summaries and casts

References

Emirati animated television series
Cartoon Network original programming
2013 Emirati television series debuts
2010s Emirati television series
2010s animated television series